The following is a list of the top 20 exports of Canada. Data is for 2012, in millions of United States dollars, as reported by The Observatory of Economic Complexity.

References
 atlas.media.mit.edu - Observatory of Economic complexity - Products exported by Canada (2012)

Foreign trade of Canada
Canada
Exports